In mathematics, and specifically in the field of homotopy theory, the Freudenthal suspension theorem is the fundamental result leading to the concept of stabilization of homotopy groups and ultimately to stable homotopy theory.  It explains the behavior of simultaneously taking suspensions and increasing the index of the homotopy groups of the space in question. It was proved in 1937 by Hans Freudenthal.

The theorem is a corollary of the homotopy excision theorem.

Statement of the theorem
Let X be an n-connected pointed space (a pointed CW-complex or pointed simplicial set). The map

induces a map

on homotopy groups, where Ω denotes the loop functor and Σ denotes the reduced suspension functor. The suspension theorem then states that the induced map on homotopy groups is an isomorphism if k ≤ 2n and an epimorphism if k = 2n + 1.

A basic result on loop spaces gives the relation

so the theorem could otherwise be stated in terms of the map

with the small caveat that in this case one must be careful with the indexing.

Proof

As mentioned above, the Freudenthal suspension theorem follows quickly from homotopy excision; this proof is in terms of the natural map . Then, homotopy excision says the inclusion map: 

 

From the same relative long exact sequence,  and since in addition cones are contractible, 

Putting this all together, we get 

 

, as claimed above; for  the left and right maps are isomorphisms, regardless of how connected  is, and the middle one is a surjection by excision, so the composition is a surjection as claimed.

Corollary 1

These groups represent the kth stable homotopy group of spheres.

Corollary 2

More generally, for fixed k ≥ 1, k ≤ 2n for sufficiently large n, so that any n-connected space X will have corresponding stabilized homotopy groups.  These groups are actually the homotopy groups of an object corresponding to X in the stable homotopy category.

References
.
.

.

Theorems in homotopy theory